Syed Ghazi Ghazan Jamal Orakzai is a Pakistani politician who was a member of the Provincial Assembly of Khyber Pakhtunkhwa from August 2019 to January 2023.

Political career
Orakzai contested the 2019 Khyber Pakhtunkhwa provincial election on 20 July 2019 from constituency PK-110 (Orakzai) as an independent. He won the election by the majority of 3,749 votes over the runner up, Shoaib Hassan Afridi of Pakistan Tehreek-e-Insaf. He garnered 18,448 votes while Afridi received 14,699 votes.

References

Living people
Independent MPAs (Khyber Pakhtunkhwa)
Politicians from Khyber Pakhtunkhwa
Year of birth missing (living people)